Wixia is a genus of South American orb-weaver spiders first described by O. Pickard-Cambridge in 1882, containing the single species, Wixia abdominalis. There used to be many more, but they have all been moved, dispersed between Ocrepeira, Alpaida, and several other genera.

References

Araneidae
Monotypic Araneomorphae genera
Spiders of South America